Sant Cugat is a railway station in Sant Cugat del Vallès in Catalonia, Spain. It is served by lines S1, S2, S5, S6, and S7 of the Metro del Vallès commuter rail system, which are operated by Ferrocarrils de la Generalitat de Catalunya (FGC), who also runs the station.

Sant Cugat is the last station before the Metro del Vallès branches to Terrassa (lines S1 and S5) and Sabadell (lines S2 and S55) split and take different routes. Sant Cugat is also the outer terminus of some trains on line S5. The station is in fare zone 2C of the Autoritat del Transport Metropolità fare system.

The station has twin tracks, with two side platforms, and a pedestrian subway links the two platforms. Immediately to the north of the station is a flat junction between the two branches. Beyond this junction, between the tracks of the Sabadell branch, is a siding used to reverse trains on line S55.

The station opened in 1917 with the opening of the line from Les Planes.

References

External links
 

Stations on the Barcelona–Vallès Line
Railway stations in Vallès Occidental
Railway stations in Spain opened in 1917
Transport in Sant Cugat del Vallès